Posyolok imeni Vladimira Ilyicha is a rural locality (a settlement) in Nizhesuetsky Selsoviet of Suyetsky District, Altai Krai, Russia. The population was 128 in 2016. There are 4 streets.

Geography 
Posyolok imeni Vladimira Ilyicha is located 32 km southwest of Verkh-Suyetka (the district's administrative centre) by road. Sibirsky Gigant is the nearest rural locality.

References 

Rural localities in Suyetsky District